Frank Morrison may refer to:

 Frank Morrison (labor unionist) (1859–1949), Canadian leader of the American Federation of Labor
 Frank B. Morrison (1905–2004), American politician
 Frank B. Morrison Jr. (1937–2006), American jurist
 Frank Morrison, character in Outnumbered

See also
 Francis Morrison (1845–1913), Medal of Honor recipient